The Critérium du Dauphiné, before 2010 known as the Critérium du Dauphiné Libéré, is an annual cycling road race in the Dauphiné region in the southeast of France. The race is run over eight days during the first half of June. It is part of the UCI World Tour calendar and counts as one of the foremost races in the lead-up to the Tour de France in July, along with the Tour de Suisse in the latter half of June.

The race was inaugurated in 1947 by a local newspaper, the Dauphiné Libéré, which served as the event's title sponsor until 2009. Since 2010 the race has been organized by ASO, which also organizes most other prominent French cycling races, notably the Tour de France, Paris–Nice and Paris–Roubaix.

As the Dauphiné is set in the Rhône-Alpes region, part of the French Alps, the race's protagonists are often climbing specialists. Many well-known climbs from the Tour de France – like the Mont Ventoux, the Col du Galibier or Col de la Chartreuse – are regularly addressed in the Dauphiné. Five riders, Nello Lauredi, Luis Ocaña, Charly Mottet, Bernard Hinault and Chris Froome, share the record of most wins, with three each.

History

Creation
The race was created in 1947 by newspaper Le Dauphiné libéré to promote its circulation. After World War II, as cycling recovered from a universal five- or six-year hiatus, the Grenoble-based newspaper decided to create and organize a cycling stage race covering the Dauphiné region. The race was named after the newspaper and set in June, prior to the Tour de France. Polish rider Edward Klabiński won the inaugural edition.

Because of its mountainous route and date on the calendar, the race served as preparation for the Tour de France by French cyclists. French cycling icons Jean Robic and Louison Bobet used the Dauphiné Libéré as the ultimate stage race in their build-up towards the Tour de France.

The event was discontinued for two years in 1967 and 1968. The current form of the Critérium du Dauphiné is the consequence of a merger with the Circuit des Six-Provinces-Dauphiné in 1969. For many years, the organization of the Dauphiné was shared between the newspaper publishers and ASO. In 2010, the newspaper ceded all organizational responsibility to ASO, and the race's name was abbreviated to Critérium du Dauphiné.

For many decades, the race has also served as a test for both bike manufacturers to test advanced equipment, and for TV broadcasters preparing the Tour de France, as TV coverage is difficult in the mountainous region.

World Tour Event

In the 1990s the race was categorized as a UCI 2.HC event, cycling's highest-rated stage races behind the Grand Tours. In 2005 it was included in the inaugural UCI Pro Tour and in 2011 in its successor, the UCI World Tour.

The Critérium du Dauphiné is the only race that was won by all the quintuple winners of the Tour de France, namely Jacques Anquetil, Eddy Merckx, Bernard Hinault and Miguel Induráin. Ten racers have also won the race and the Tour de France in the same year: Louison Bobet in 1955; Anquetil in 1963; Merckx in 1971; Luis Ocaña in 1973; Bernard Thévenet in 1975; Hinault in 1979 and 1981; Induráin in 1995; Bradley Wiggins in 2012; Chris Froome in 2013, 2015, and 2016; and Geraint Thomas in 2018. Lance Armstrong won the race in 2002 and 2003, but was retroactively stripped of his titles in 2013, in the wake of the protracted doping scandal.

Route

The Dauphiné is raced over 8 days in the Rhône-Alpes region in the southeast of France, traditionally covering portions of the French Alps. The race has often, but not always, started with an opening prologue on Sunday. The Monday and Tuesday stages are usually held in the lower hilly regions of Rhône-Alpes, before addressing the high mountains in the second half of the Dauphiné. Often there is one long individual or team time trial included.

Benefiting from its location and place on the calendar, race organizers often feature a mountain stage with a route that is nearly identical to what the Tour will trace one month later.

Grenoble, the capital of the Dauphiné region, has hosted the start or finish of a stage most often. Other cities regularly hosting a stage are Avignon, Saint-Étienne, Annecy, Chambéry, Gap, Lyon, Aix-les-Bains, Valence, Briançon and Vals-les-Bains.

Jerseys

The leader of the general classification wears a yellow jersey with a blue band, distinct from the other racers.  In 1948, a mountains classification was added, which as of 2017 gives a polka-dot jersey to the leader. In 1955, a points classification was added, which gives a green jersey to the leader.

Winners

|-style="color:gray"
|2002
|colspan="4"|Result void
|-style="color:gray"
|2003
|colspan="4"|Result void

|-style="color:gray"
|2006
|colspan="4"|Result void

Multiple winners
Riders in italic are still active

Wins per country

There have been 73 editions since 1947. Three editions (2002, 2003 and 2006) have been stripped of their initial winners Lance Armstrong and Levi Leipheimer. Organizer ASO intends to keep these results voided.

Notes

References

External links
 
 

 
1947 establishments in France
Cycle races in France
Recurring sporting events established in 1947
UCI ProTour races
UCI World Tour races
Super Prestige Pernod races